This page lists all described species of the spider family Idiopidae accepted by the World Spider Catalog :

A

Arbanitis

Arbanitis L. Koch, 1874
 A. andrewsi (Hogg, 1902) — Australia (South Australia)
 A. baehrae (Wishart & Rowell, 2008) — Australia (New South Wales)
 A. beaury Raven & Wishart, 2006 — Australia (New South Wales)
 A. beni (Wishart, 2006) — Australia (New South Wales)
 A. billsheari (Wishart & Rowell, 2008) — Australia (New South Wales)
 A. biroi (Kulczyński, 1908) — Australia (New South Wales)
 A. bithongabel (Raven & Wishart, 2006) — Australia (Queensland)
 A. browningi (Wishart & Rowell, 2008) — Australia (New South Wales)
 A. campbelli (Wishart & Rowell, 2008) — Australia (New South Wales)
 A. cliffi (Wishart, 2006) — Australia (New South Wales)
 A. crawfordorum (Wishart & Rowell, 2008) — Australia (New South Wales)
 A. crispus (Karsch, 1878) — Australia (Tasmania)
 A. davidwilsoni (Wishart & Rowell, 2008) — Australia (New South Wales)
 A. dereki (Wishart, 1992) — Australia (New South Wales)
 A. dougweiri (Wishart & Rowell, 2008) — Australia (New South Wales)
 A. echo (Raven & Wishart, 2006) — Australia (Queensland, New South Wales)
 A. elegans Rainbow & Pulleine, 1918 — Australia (New South Wales)
 A. fredcoylei (Wishart & Rowell, 2008) — Australia (New South Wales)
 A. gracilis Rainbow & Pulleine, 1918 — Australia (New South Wales), possibly New Guinea
 A. grayi (Wishart & Rowell, 2008) — Australia (New South Wales)
 A. gwennethae (Wishart, 2011) — Australia (New South Wales)
 A. helensmithae (Wishart & Rowell, 2008) — Australia (New South Wales)
 A. hirsutus Rainbow & Pulleine, 1918 — Australia (Queensland)
 A. horsemanae (Wishart, 2011) — Australia (New South Wales)
 A. kampenae (Wishart, 2011) — Australia (New South Wales)
 A. kirstiae (Wishart, 1992) — Australia (New South Wales)
 A. linklateri (Wishart & Rowell, 2008) — Australia (New South Wales)
 A. longipes (L. Koch, 1873) (type) — Australia (Queensland, New South Wales)
 A. lynabra (Wishart, 2006) — Australia (New South Wales)
 A. macei (Wishart & Rowell, 2008) — Australia (New South Wales)
 A. maculosus (Rainbow & Pulleine, 1918) — Australia (New South Wales)
 A. mascordi (Wishart, 1992) — Australia (New South Wales)
 A. maxhicksi (Wishart & Rowell, 2008) — Australia (New South Wales)
 A. melancholicus (Rainbow & Pulleine, 1918) — Australia (New South Wales)
 A. michaeli (Wishart, 2006) — Australia (New South Wales)
 A. milledgei (Wishart & Rowell, 2008) — Australia (New South Wales)
 A. montanus Rainbow & Pulleine, 1918 — Australia (New South Wales)
 A. monteithi (Raven & Wishart, 2006) — Australia (Queensland)
 A. mudfordae (Wishart & Rowell, 2008) — Australia (New South Wales)
 A. ornatus (Rainbow, 1914) — Australia (Queensland)
 A. papillosus (Rainbow & Pulleine, 1918) — Australia (Queensland)
 A. paulaskewi (Wishart, 2011) — Australia (New South Wales)
 A. phippsi (Wishart, 2011) — Australia (New South Wales)
 A. rapax (Karsch, 1878) — Australia (New South Wales)
 A. raveni (Wishart & Rowell, 2008) — Australia (New South Wales)
 A. robertcollinsi Raven & Wishart, 2006 — Australia (Queensland)
 A. robertsi (Main & Mascord, 1974) — Australia (New South Wales)
 A. rodi (Wishart, 2006) — Australia (New South Wales)
 A. rowelli (Wishart, 2011) — Australia (New South Wales)
 A. shawi (Wishart, 2011) — Australia (New South Wales)
 A. sydjordanae (Wishart & Rowell, 2008) — Australia (New South Wales)
 A. taiti (Wishart & Rowell, 2008) — Australia (New South Wales)
 A. tannerae (Wishart, 2011) — Australia (New South Wales)
 A. tarnawskiae (Wishart & Rowell, 2008) — Australia (New South Wales)
 A. thompsonae (Wishart & Rowell, 2008) — Australia (New South Wales)
 A. trangae (Wishart, 2006) — Australia (New South Wales)
 A. villosus (Rainbow, 1914) — Australia (New South Wales)
 A. watsonorum (Wishart & Rowell, 2008) — Australia (New South Wales)
 A. wayorum (Wishart, 2006) — Australia (New South Wales)
 A. weigelorum (Wishart & Rowell, 2008) — Australia (New South Wales)
 A. yorkmainae (Wishart & Rowell, 2008) — Australia (New South Wales)

B

Blakistonia

Blakistonia Hogg, 1902
 B. aurea Hogg, 1902 (type) — Australia (South Australia, Victoria, New South Wales)
 B. bassi Harrison, Rix, Harvey & Austin, 2018 — Australia (South Australia)
 B. bella Harrison, Rix, Harvey & Austin, 2018 — Australia (South Australia)
 B. birksi Harrison, Rix, Harvey & Austin, 2018 — Australia (South Australia, Victoria)
 B. carnarvon Harrison, Rix, Harvey & Austin, 2018 — Australia (Queensland)
 B. emmottorum Harrison, Rix, Harvey & Austin, 2018 — Australia (Queensland)
 B. gemmelli Harrison, Rix, Harvey & Austin, 2018 — Australia (South Australia)
 B. hortoni Harrison, Rix, Harvey & Austin, 2018 — Australia (South Australia)
 B. mainae Harrison, Rix, Harvey & Austin, 2018 — Australia (Western Australia)
 B. maryae Harrison, Rix, Harvey & Austin, 2018 — Australia (South Australia)
 B. newtoni Harrison, Rix, Harvey & Austin, 2018 — Australia (South Australia)
 B. nullarborensis Harrison, Rix, Harvey & Austin, 2018 — Australia (Western Australia)
 B. olea Harrison, Rix, Harvey & Austin, 2018 — Australia (Western Australia)
 B. parva Harrison, Rix, Harvey & Austin, 2018 — Australia (South Australia)
 B. pidax Harrison, Rix, Harvey & Austin, 2018 — Australia (South Australia)
 B. plata Harrison, Rix, Harvey & Austin, 2018 — Australia (Queensland)
 B. raveni Harrison, Rix, Harvey & Austin, 2018 — Australia (Queensland)
 B. tariae Harrison, Rix, Harvey & Austin, 2018 — Australia (Western Australia)
 B. tunstilli Harrison, Rix, Harvey & Austin, 2018 — Australia (South Australia)
 B. wingellina Harrison, Rix, Harvey & Austin, 2018 — Australia (Western Australia)

Bungulla

Bungulla Rix, Main, Raven & Harvey, 2017
 B. ajana Rix, Raven & Harvey, 2018 — Australia (Western Australia)
 B. aplini Rix, Raven & Harvey, 2018 — Australia (Western Australia)
 B. banksia Rix, Raven & Harvey, 2018 — Australia (Western Australia)
 B. bella Rix, Raven & Harvey, 2018 — Australia (Western Australia)
 B. bertmaini Rix, Main, Raven & Harvey, 2017 (type) — Australia (Western Australia)
 B. bidgemia Rix, Raven & Harvey, 2018 — Australia (Western Australia)
 B. biota Rix, Raven & Harvey, 2018 — Australia (Western Australia)
 B. bringo Rix, Raven & Harvey, 2018 — Australia (Western Australia)
 B. burbidgei Rix, Raven & Harvey, 2018 — Australia (Western Australia)
 B. dipsodes Rix, Raven & Harvey, 2018 — Australia (Western Australia)
 B. disrupta Rix, Raven & Harvey, 2018 — Australia (Western Australia)
 B. ferraria Rix, Raven & Harvey, 2018 — Australia (Western Australia)
 B. fusca Rix, Raven & Harvey, 2018 — Australia (Western Australia)
 B. gibba Rix, Raven & Harvey, 2018 — Australia (Western Australia)
 B. hamelinensis Rix, Raven & Harvey, 2018 — Australia (Western Australia)
 B. harrisonae Rix, Raven & Harvey, 2018 — Australia (Western Australia)
 B. hillyerae Rix, Raven & Harvey, 2018 — Australia (Western Australia)
 B. inermis Rix, Raven & Harvey, 2018 — Australia (Western Australia)
 B. iota Rix, Raven & Harvey, 2018 — Australia (Western Australia)
 B. keigheryi Rix, Raven & Harvey, 2018 — Australia (Western Australia)
 B. keirani Rix, Raven & Harvey, 2018 — Australia (Western Australia)
 B. kendricki Rix, Raven & Harvey, 2018 — Australia (Western Australia)
 B. laevigata Rix, Raven & Harvey, 2018 — Australia (Western Australia)
 B. mckenziei Rix, Raven & Harvey, 2018 — Australia (Western Australia)
 B. oraria Rix, Raven & Harvey, 2018 — Australia (Western Australia)
 B. parva Rix, Raven & Harvey, 2018 — Australia (Western Australia)
 B. quobba Rix, Raven & Harvey, 2018 — Australia (Western Australia)
 B. riparia (Main, 1957) — Australia (Western Australia)
 B. sampeyae Rix, Raven & Harvey, 2018 — Australia (Western Australia)
 B. weld Rix, Raven & Harvey, 2018 — Australia (Western Australia)
 B. westi Rix, Raven & Harvey, 2018 — Australia (Western Australia)
 B. yeni Rix, Raven & Harvey, 2018 — Australia (Western Australia)

C

Cantuaria

Cantuaria Hogg, 1902
 C. abdita Forster, 1968 — New Zealand
 C. allani Forster, 1968 — New Zealand
 C. aperta Forster, 1968 — New Zealand
 C. apica Forster, 1968 — New Zealand
 C. assimilis Forster, 1968 — New Zealand
 C. borealis Forster, 1968 — New Zealand
 C. catlinsensis Forster, 1968 — New Zealand
 C. cognata Forster, 1968 — New Zealand
 C. collensis (Todd, 1945) — New Zealand
 C. delli Forster, 1968 — New Zealand
 C. dendyi (Hogg, 1901) (type) — New Zealand
 C. depressa Forster, 1968 — New Zealand
 C. dunedinensis Forster, 1968 — New Zealand
 C. gilliesi (O. Pickard-Cambridge, 1878) — New Zealand
 C. grandis Forster, 1968 — New Zealand
 C. huttoni (O. Pickard-Cambridge, 1880) — New Zealand
 C. insulana Forster, 1968 — New Zealand
 C. isolata Forster, 1968 — New Zealand
 C. johnsi Forster, 1968 — New Zealand
 C. kakahuensis Forster, 1968 — New Zealand
 C. kakanuiensis Forster, 1968 — New Zealand
 C. lomasi Forster, 1968 — New Zealand
 C. magna Forster, 1968 — New Zealand
 C. marplesi (Todd, 1945) — New Zealand
 C. maxima Forster, 1968 — New Zealand
 C. medialis Forster, 1968 — New Zealand
 C. mestoni (Hickman, 1928) — Australia (Tasmania)
 C. minor Forster, 1968 — New Zealand
 C. myersi Forster, 1968 — New Zealand
 C. napua Forster, 1968 — New Zealand
 C. orepukiensis Forster, 1968 — New Zealand
 C. parrotti Forster, 1968 — New Zealand
 C. pilama Forster, 1968 — New Zealand
 C. prina Forster, 1968 — New Zealand
 C. reducta Forster, 1968 — New Zealand
 C. secunda Forster, 1968 — New Zealand
 C. sinclairi Forster, 1968 — New Zealand
 C. stephenensis Forster, 1968 — New Zealand
 C. stewarti (Todd, 1945) — New Zealand
 C. sylvatica Forster, 1968 — New Zealand
 C. toddae Forster, 1968 — New Zealand
 C. vellosa Forster, 1968 — New Zealand
 C. wanganuiensis (Todd, 1945) — New Zealand

Cataxia

Cataxia Rainbow, 1914
 C. babindaensis Main, 1969 — Australia (Queensland)
 C. barrettae Rix, Bain, Main & Harvey, 2017 — Australia (Western Australia)
 C. bolganupensis (Main, 1985) — Australia (Western Australia)
 C. colesi Rix, Bain, Main & Harvey, 2017 — Australia (Western Australia)
 C. cunicularius (Main, 1983) — Australia (Queensland)
 C. dietrichae Main, 1985 — Australia (Queensland)
 C. eungellaensis Main, 1969 — Australia (Queensland)
 C. maculata Rainbow, 1914 (type) — Australia (Queensland)
 C. melindae Rix, Bain, Main & Harvey, 2017 — Australia (Western Australia)
 C. pallida (Rainbow & Pulleine, 1918) — Australia (Queensland)
 C. pulleinei (Rainbow, 1914) — Australia (Queensland, New South Wales)
 C. sandsorum Rix, Bain, Main & Harvey, 2017 — Australia (Western Australia)
 C. spinipectoris Main, 1969 — Australia (Queensland)
 C. stirlingi (Main, 1985) — Australia (Western Australia)
 C. victoriae (Main, 1985) — Australia (Victoria)

Cryptoforis

Cryptoforis Wilson, Rix & Raven, 2020
C. absona Wilson, Raven & Rix, 2021 – Australia (New South Wales)
C. arenaria Wilson, Raven & Rix, 2021 – Australia (Queensland)
C. cairncross Wilson, Raven & Rix, 2021 – Australia (Queensland)
C. cassisi Wilson, Raven & Rix, 2021 – Australia (New South Wales)
C. celata Wilson, Raven & Rix, 2021 – Australia (New South Wales)
C. cooloola Wilson, Raven & Rix, 2021 – Australia (Queensland)
C. fallax Wilson, Raven & Rix, 2021 – Australia (New South Wales)
C. grayi Wilson, Raven & Rix, 2021 – Australia (New South Wales)
C. hickmani Wilson, Raven & Rix, 2021 – Australia (Tasmania)
C. hughesae Wilson, Rix & Raven, 2020 (type) – Australia (Queensland)
C. mainae Wilson, Raven & Rix, 2021 – Australia (Queensland, New South Wales)
C. montana Wilson, Raven & Rix, 2021 – Australia (Queensland)
C. monteithi Wilson, Raven & Rix, 2021 – Australia (Queensland)
C. tasmanica (Hickman, 1928) – Australia (Tasmania)
C. victoriensis (Main, 1995) – Australia (Victoria)
C. woondum Wilson, Raven & Rix, 2021 – Australia (Queensland)
C. xenophila Wilson, Raven & Rix, 2021 – Australia (Tasmania)
C. zophera Wilson, Raven & Rix, 2021 – Australia (Victoria)

Ctenolophus

Ctenolophus Purcell, 1904
 C. cregoei (Purcell, 1902) — South Africa
 C. fenoulheti Hewitt, 1913 — South Africa
 C. kolbei (Purcell, 1902) (type) — South Africa
 C. oomi Hewitt, 1913 — South Africa
 C. pectinipalpis (Purcell, 1903) — South Africa
 C. spiricola (Purcell, 1903) — South Africa

E

Eucanippe

Eucanippe Rix, Main, Raven & Harvey, 2017
 E. absita Rix, Main, Raven & Harvey, 2018 — Australia (Western Australia)
 E. agastachys Rix, Main, Raven & Harvey, 2018 — Australia (Western Australia)
 E. bifida Rix, Main, Raven & Harvey, 2017 (type) — Australia (Western Australia)
 E. eucla Rix, Main, Raven & Harvey, 2018 — Australia (Western Australia)
 E. mallee Rix, Main, Raven & Harvey, 2018 — Australia (Western Australia)
 E. mouldsi Rix, Main, Raven & Harvey, 2018 — Australia (Western Australia)
 E. nemestrina Rix, Main, Raven & Harvey, 2018 — Australia (Western Australia)

Eucyrtops

Eucyrtops Pocock, 1897
 E. eremaeus Main, 1957 — Australia (Western Australia)
 E. ksenijae(Rix & Harvey, 2022) – Australia (Western Australia)
 E. latior (O. Pickard-Cambridge, 1877) (type) — Australia (Western Australia)

Euoplos

Euoplos Rainbow, 1914
Euoplos bairnsdale (Main, 1995) – Australia (Victoria)
Euoplos ballidu (Main, 2000) – Australia (Western Australia)
Euoplos booloumba (Wilson & Rix, 2021) – Australia (Queensland)
Euoplos cornishi Rix, Wilson & Harvey, 2019 – Australia (Western Australia)
Euoplos crenatus Wilson, Rix & Raven, 2019 – Australia (Queensland)
Euoplos eungellaensis (Wilson, Harvey & Rix, 2022) – Australia (Queensland)
Euoplos festivus (Rainbow & Pulleine, 1918) – Australia (Western Australia)
Euoplos goomboorian Wilson, Rix & Raven, 2019 – Australia (Queensland)
Euoplos grandis Wilson & Rix, 2019 – Australia (Queensland)
Euoplos hoggi (Simon, 1908) – Australia (Western Australia, South Australia)
Euoplos inornatus (Rainbow & Pulleine, 1918) – Australia (Western Australia)
Euoplos jayneae (Wilson & Rix, 2021) – Australia (Queensland)
Euoplos kalbarri Rix, Wilson & Harvey, 2019 – Australia (Western Australia)
Euoplos mcmillani (Main, 2000) – Australia (Western Australia)
Euoplos ornatus (Rainbow & Pulleine, 1918) – Australia (Queensland)
Euoplos raveni (Wilson & Rix, 2021) – Australia (Queensland)
Euoplos regalis (Wilson & Rix, 2021) – Australia (Queensland)
Euoplos saplan Rix, Wilson & Harvey, 2019 – Australia (Western Australia)
Euoplos schmidti (Wilson & Rix, 2021) – Australia (Queensland)
Euoplos similaris (Rainbow & Pulleine, 1918) – Australia (Queensland)
Euoplos spinnipes Rainbow, 1914 (type) – Australia (Queensland)
Euoplos thynnearum Wilson, Rix & Raven, 2019 – Australia (Queensland)
Euoplos turrificus Wilson, Rix & Raven, 2019 – Australia (Queensland)
Euoplos variabilis (Rainbow & Pulleine, 1918) – Australia (Queensland, New South Wales)

G

Gaius

Gaius Rainbow, 1914
 G. aurora Rix, Raven & Harvey, 2018 — Australia (Western Australia)
 G. austini Rix, Raven & Harvey, 2018 — Australia (Western Australia)
 G. cooperi Rix, Raven & Harvey, 2018 — Australia (Western Australia)
 G. hueyi Rix, Raven & Harvey, 2018 — Australia (Western Australia)
 G. humphreysi Rix, Raven & Harvey, 2018 — Australia (Western Australia)
 G. mainae Rix, Raven & Harvey, 2018 — Australia (Western Australia)
 G. tealei Rix, Raven & Harvey, 2018 — Australia (Western Australia)
 G. villosus Rainbow, 1914 (type) — Australia (Western Australia)

Galeosoma

Galeosoma Purcell, 1903
 G. coronatum Hewitt, 1915 — South Africa
 G. c. sphaeroideum Hewitt, 1919 — South Africa
 G. crinitum Hewitt, 1919 — South Africa
 G. hirsutum Hewitt, 1916 — South Africa
 G. mossambicum Hewitt, 1919 — Mozambique
 G. pallidum Hewitt, 1915 — South Africa
 G. p. pilosum Hewitt, 1916 — South Africa
 G. planiscutatum Hewitt, 1919 — South Africa
 G. pluripunctatum Hewitt, 1919 — South Africa
 G. robertsi Hewitt, 1916 — South Africa
 G. schreineri Hewitt, 1913 — South Africa
 G. scutatum Purcell, 1903 (type) — South Africa
 G. vandami Hewitt, 1915 — South Africa
 G. v. circumjunctum Hewitt, 1919 — South Africa
 G. vernayi Hewitt, 1935 — Botswana

Genysa

Genysa Simon, 1889
 G. bicalcarata Simon, 1889 (type) — Madagascar
 G. decorsei (Simon, 1902) — Madagascar
 G. decorsei (Simon, 1902) — Madagascar

Gorgyrella

Gorgyrella Purcell, 1902
 G. hirschhorni (Hewitt, 1919) — Zimbabwe
 G. inermis Tucker, 1917 — Tanzania
 G. namaquensis Purcell, 1902 (type) — South Africa
 G. schreineri Purcell, 1903 — South Africa
 G. s. minor (Hewitt, 1916) — South Africa

H

Heligmomerus

Heligmomerus Simon, 1892
 H. astutus (Hewitt, 1915) — South Africa
 H. barkudensis (Gravely, 1921) — India
 H. biharicus (Gravely, 1915) — India
 H. caffer Purcell, 1903 — South Africa
 H. carsoni Pocock, 1897 — Tanzania
 H. deserti Pocock, 1901 — Botswana
 H. garoensis (Tikader, 1977) — India
 H. jeanneli Berland, 1914 — East Africa
 H. maximus Sanap & Mirza, 2015 — India
 H. prostans Simon, 1892 — India
 H. somalicus Pocock, 1896 — Somalia
 H. taprobanicus Simon, 1892 (type) — Sri Lanka
 H. wii Siliwal, Hippargi, Yadav & Kumar, 2020 — India

Hiboka

Hiboka Fage, 1922
 H. geayi Fage, 1922 (type) — Madagascar

I

Idiops

Idiops Perty, 1833
 I. angusticeps (Pocock, 1900) — West Africa
 I. argus Simon, 1889 — Venezuela
 I. arnoldi Hewitt, 1914 — South Africa
 I. aussereri Simon, 1876 — Congo
 I. bombayensis Siliwal, Molur & Biswas, 2005 — India
 I. bonapartei Hasselt, 1888 — Suriname
 I. bonny Siliwal, Hippargi, Yadav & Kumar, 2020 — India
 I. cambridgei Ausserer, 1875 — Colombia
 I. camelus (Mello-Leitão, 1937) — Brazil
 I. carajas Fonseca-Ferreira, Zampaulo & Guadanucci, 2017 — Brazil
 I. castaneus Hewitt, 1913 — South Africa
 I. clarus (Mello-Leitão, 1946) — Argentina, Uruguay
 I. crassus Simon, 1884 — Myanmar
 I. crudeni (Hewitt, 1914) — South Africa
 I. curvicalcar Roewer, 1953 — Congo
 I. curvipes (Thorell, 1899) — Cameroon
 I. damarensis Hewitt, 1934 — Namibia
 I. designatus O. Pickard-Cambridge, 1885 — India
 I. duocordibus (Fonseca-Ferreira, Guadanucci & Brescovit, 2021) — Brazil
 I. fageli Roewer, 1953 — Congo
 I. flaveolus (Pocock, 1901) — South Africa
 I. fossor (Pocock, 1900) — India
 I. fryi (Purcell, 1903) — South Africa
 I. fuscus Perty, 1833 (type) — Brazil
 I. gerhardti Hewitt, 1913 — South Africa
 I. germaini Simon, 1892 — Brazil
 I. gracilipes (Hewitt, 1919) — South Africa
 I. grandis (Hewitt, 1915) — South Africa
 I. gunningi Hewitt, 1913 — South Africa
 I. g. elongatus Hewitt, 1915 — South Africa
 I. guri (Fonseca-Ferreira, Guadanucci & Brescovit, 2021) — Brazil
 I. hamiltoni (Pocock, 1902) — South Africa
 I. harti (Pocock, 1893) — St. Vincent
 I. hepburni (Hewitt, 1919) — South Africa, Lesotho
 I. hirsutipedis Mello-Leitão, 1941 — Argentina
 I. hirsutus (Hewitt, 1919) — South Africa
 I. joida Gupta, Das & Siliwal, 2013 — India
 I. kaasensis Mirza, Vaze & Sanap, 2012 — India
 I. kanonganus Roewer, 1953 — Congo
 I. kaperonis Roewer, 1953 — Congo
 I. kazibius Roewer, 1953 — Congo
 I. kentanicus (Purcell, 1903) — South Africa
 I. lacustris (Pocock, 1897) — Tanzania
 I. lusingius Roewer, 1953 — Congo
 I. madrasensis (Tikader, 1977) — India
 I. mafae Lawrence, 1927 — Namibia
 I. meadei O. Pickard-Cambridge, 1870 — Uganda
 I. medini Pratihar & Das, 2020 — India
 I. mettupalayam Ganeshkumar & Siliwal, 2013 — India
 I. microps (Hewitt, 1913) — South Africa
 I. minguito Ferretti, 2017 — Argentina
 I. mocambo (Fonseca-Ferreira, Guadanucci & Brescovit, 2021) — Brazil
 I. monticola (Hewitt, 1916) — South Africa
 I. monticoloides (Hewitt, 1919) — South Africa
 I. mossambicus (Hewitt, 1919) — Mozambique
 I. munois Roewer, 1953 — Congo
 I. neglectus L. Koch, 1875 — Unknown
 I. nigropilosus (Hewitt, 1919) — South Africa
 I. nilagiri Das & Diksha, 2019 — India
 I. nilopolensis (Mello-Leitão, 1923) — Brazil
 I. ochreolus (Pocock, 1902) — South Africa
 I. opifex (Simon, 1889) — French Guiana
 I. oriya Siliwal, 2013 — India
 I. palapyi Tucker, 1917 — Botswana
 I. pallidipes Purcell, 1908 — Namibia
 I. parvus Hewitt, 1915 — South Africa
 I. petiti (Guérin, 1838) — Brazil
 I. piluso Ferretti, Nime & Mattoni, 2017 — Argentina
 I. pirassununguensis Fukami & Lucas, 2005 — Brazil
 I. prescotti Schenkel, 1937 — Tanzania
 I. pretoriae (Pocock, 1898) — South Africa
 I. pulcher Hewitt, 1914 — South Africa
 I. pulloides Hewitt, 1919 — South Africa
 I. pullus Tucker, 1917 — South Africa
 I. pungwensis Purcell, 1904 — South Africa
 I. pylorus Schwendinger, 1991 — Thailand
 I. rastratus (O. Pickard-Cambridge, 1889) — Brazil
 I. reshma Siliwal, Hippargi, Yadav & Kumar, 2020 — India
 I. robustus (Pocock, 1898) — East Africa
 I. rohdei Karsch, 1886 — Paraguay
 I. royi Roewer, 1961 — Senegal
 I. rubrolimbatus Mirza & Sanap, 2012 — India
 I. sally Siliwal, Hippargi, Yadav & Kumar, 2020 — India
 I. santaremius (F. O. Pickard-Cambridge, 1896) — Brazil
 I. schenkeli Lessert, 1938 — Congo
 I. siolii (Bücherl, 1953) — Brazil
 I. straeleni Roewer, 1953 — Congo
 I. striatipes Purcell, 1908 — Botswana
 I. sylvestris (Hewitt, 1925) — South Africa
 I. syriacus O. Pickard-Cambridge, 1870 — Syria, Israel
 I. thorelli O. Pickard-Cambridge, 1870 — South Africa
 I. tolengo Ferretti, 2017 — Argentina
 I. upembensis Roewer, 1953 — Congo
 I. vandami (Hewitt, 1925) — South Africa
 I. vankhede Siliwal, Hippargi, Yadav & Kumar, 2020 — India
 I. versicolor (Purcell, 1903) — South Africa
 I. wittei Roewer, 1953 — Congo
 I. yemenensis Simon, 1890 — Yemen

Idiosoma

Idiosoma Ausserer, 1871
 I. arenaceum Rix & Harvey, 2018 — Australia (Western Australia)
 I. berlandi (Rainbow, 1914) — Australia (New South Wales)
 I. castellum (Main, 1986) — Australia (Western Australia)
 I. clypeatum Rix & Harvey, 2018 — Australia (Western Australia)
 I. corrugatum Rix & Harvey, 2018 — Australia (South Australia)
 I. cupulifex (Main, 1957) — Australia (Western Australia)
 I. dandaragan Rix & Harvey, 2018 — Australia (Western Australia)
 I. formosum Rix & Harvey, 2018 — Australia (Western Australia)
 I. galeosomoides Rix, Main, Raven & Harvey, 2017 — Australia (Western Australia)
 I. gardneri Rix & Harvey, 2018 — Australia (Western Australia)
 I. gutharuka Rix & Harvey, 2018 — Australia (Western Australia)
 I. incomptum Rix & Harvey, 2018 — Australia (Western Australia)
 I. intermedium Rix & Harvey, 2018 — Australia (Western Australia)
 I. jarrah Rix & Harvey, 2018 — Australia (Western Australia)
 I. kopejtkaorum Rix & Harvey, 2018 — Australia (Western Australia)
 I. kwongan Rix & Harvey, 2018 — Australia (Western Australia)
 I. manstridgei (Pocock, 1897) — Australia (Western Australia)
 I. mcclementsorum Rix & Harvey, 2018 — Australia (Western Australia)
 I. mcnamarai Rix & Harvey, 2018 — Australia (Western Australia)
 I. montanum (Faulder, 1985) — Australia (New South Wales)
 I. nigrum Main, 1952 — Australia (Western Australia)
 I. occidentale (Hogg, 1903) — Australia (Western Australia, South Australia)
 I. planites (Faulder, 1985) — Australia (New South Wales)
 I. rhaphiduca (Rainbow & Pulleine, 1918) — Australia (Western Australia)
 I. schoknechtorum Rix & Harvey, 2018 — Australia (Western Australia)
 I. sigillatum (O. Pickard-Cambridge, 1870) (type) — Australia (Western Australia)
 I. smeatoni (Hogg, 1902) — Australia (South Australia)
 I. subtriste (O. Pickard-Cambridge, 1877) — Australia (South Australia)
 I. winsori (Faulder, 1985) — Australia (Victoria)

N

Neocteniza

Neocteniza Pocock, 1895
 N. agustinea Miranda & Arizala, 2013 — Panama
 N. australis Goloboff, 1987 — Brazil, Argentina
 N. chancani Goloboff & Platnick, 1992 — Argentina
 N. coylei Goloboff & Platnick, 1992 — Peru
 N. fantastica Platnick & Shadab, 1976 — Colombia
 N. malkini Platnick & Shadab, 1981 — Ecuador
 N. mexicana F. O. Pickard-Cambridge, 1897 — Guatemala
 N. minima Goloboff, 1987 — Bolivia, Argentina
 N. myriamae Bertani, Fukushima & Nagahama, 2006 — Brazil
 N. occulta Platnick & Shadab, 1981 — Panama
 N. osa Platnick & Shadab, 1976 — Costa Rica
 N. paucispina Platnick & Shadab, 1976 — Guatemala
 N. platnicki Goloboff, 1987 — Paraguay
 N. pococki Platnick & Shadab, 1976 — Venezuela
 N. sclateri Pocock, 1895 (type) — Guyana
 N. spinosa Goloboff, 1987 — Argentina
 N. subirana Platnick & Shadab, 1976 — Honduras
 N. toba Goloboff, 1987 — Paraguay, Argentina

P

Prothemenops

Prothemenops Schwendinger, 1991
 P. irineae Schwendinger & Hongpadharakiree, 2014 — Thailand
 P. khirikhan Schwendinger & Hongpadharakiree, 2014 — Thailand
 P. phanthurat Schwendinger & Hongpadharakiree, 2014 — Thailand
 P. siamensis Schwendinger, 1991 (type) — Thailand

S

Scalidognathus

Scalidognathus Karsch, 1892
 S. montanus (Pocock, 1900) — India
 S. nigriaraneus Sanap & Mirza, 2011 — India
 S. oreophilus Simon, 1892 — Sri Lanka
 S. radialis (O. Pickard-Cambridge, 1869) (type) — Sri Lanka
 S. seticeps Karsch, 1892 — Sri Lanka
 S. tigerinus Sanap & Mirza, 2011 — India

Segregara

Segregara Tucker, 1917
 S. abrahami (Hewitt, 1913) — South Africa
 S. paucispinulosa (Hewitt, 1915) — South Africa
 S. transvaalensis (Hewitt, 1913) (type) — South Africa

T

Titanidiops

Titanidiops Simon, 1903
 Titanidiops briodae (Schenkel, 1937) — Zimbabwe
 Titanidiops canariensis Wunderlich, 1992 — Canary Is.
 Titanidiops compactus (Gerstaecker, 1873) (type) — East Africa
 Titanidiops constructor (Pocock, 1900) — India
 Titanidiops fortis (Pocock, 1900) — India
 Titanidiops lacustris (Pocock, 1897) — Tanzania
 Titanidiops maroccanus Simon, 1909 — Morocco
 Titanidiops melloleitaoi (Caporiacco, 1949) — Kenya
 Titanidiops syriacus (O. Pickard-Cambridge, 1870) — Syria, Israel

References

Idiopidae